Miguel Ángel Mori (17 May 1943 – 13 April 2009) was an Argentine footballer who played for Independiente and Racing Club. He won the Copa Libertadores three times, first lifting the trophy with Independiente in 1964 and 1965, and then for rivals Racing Club in 1967. With the latter team, Mori also won the Intercontinental Cup, defeating the Scottish side Celtic. During his time at Racing, the club went on an unbeaten run of 39 consecutive domestic matches, a record not broken until 1999. Miguel Mori left to play in Chile in 1968, but was forced to retire following a serious ligament injury. He never won a full cap for Argentina, but played for a representative side at the 1964 Summer Olympics.

On retiring from football, Mori went on to run a bakery in Baradero. He died in hospital in 2009 following complications after receiving open heart surgery.

References

1943 births
2009 deaths
Association football defenders
Argentine footballers
Olympic footballers of Argentina
Footballers at the 1964 Summer Olympics
Club Atlético Independiente footballers
Racing Club de Avellaneda footballers